Elections to the New York State Assembly were held on November 3, 2020 in the U.S. state of New York. The elections were part of the biennial elections in the United States, with elections for the State Senate, the U.S. House, and U.S. president being held on the same day. Primary elections were held on June 23.

Assembly Democrats won 105 of the chamber's 150 seats on Election Day, while Republicans won 43 seats and two other seats were won by members of third parties.

Predictions

Summary
Longtime Asm. Carmen Arroyo (D-Bronx) was disqualified from the Democratic primary ballot due to election fraud.

Incumbent Asms. Michael DenDekker, Joseph Lentol, Michael Miller, Walter Mosley, Felix Ortiz, and Aravalla Simotas were defeated in Democratic primaries.

Incumbents Ellen Jaffee (D-Suffern) and Mark Johns (R-Webster) were defeated in the general election.

Assemblymember Rebecca Seawright was disqualified from seeking re-election as a Democrat due to paperwork errors, but instead campaigned as the candidate of the Rise and Unite Party and was re-elected.

Assemblymember Fred Thiele, a member of the Independence Party who caucuses with the Democrats, was re-elected in Assembly District One.

See also
 2020 New York state elections

Notes

References

External links
 
 
  (State affiliate of the U.S. League of Women Voters)
 

2020 New York (state) elections
New York State Assembly elections
New York House